Cai Lujun (born 16 July 1968) is a Chinese dissident writer.

Biography
Cai Lujun was born in Feixiang County, Hebei Province. He was an owner of a foreign trading company and a freelance writer. He graduated from secondary school.

Cai was one of the first persons in China to be arrested for posting articles on the internet.

He was accused of posting a series of articles online under the pen name "盼民主 (Pan Minzhu)"("expecting for democracy") criticizing the Chinese government. Cai was put under house arrest on 22 February 2003. He was found guilty of “incitement to subversion” and sentenced to three years in prison by Shijiazhuang Intermediate People's Court on 30 October 2003.

In 2006 he was released from prison. He now lives in exile in Taiwan since 2007.

See also
 Cyber-dissident
 International Freedom of Expression Exchange
 Internet

References

Sources
  Independent Chinese pen writers, writers in prison.
  Cai Lujun, Imprisoned for Posting Internet Articles, Released at End of Sentence
  Chinese Cyberdissident Cai Lujun on Freedom (CNNiReport)
  original court judgment

Chinese dissidents
Chinese democracy activists
1968 births
Living people
People from Handan